The Yale Program on Climate Change Communication (YPCCC) is a research center within the Yale School of the Environment that conducts scientific research on public climate change knowledge, attitudes, policy preferences, and behavior at the global, national, and local scales.  It grew out of a conference held in Aspen, Colorado, in 2005.

General
The program is led by Anthony Leiserowitz. As of 2017, it put out a daily 90 second audio program carried by around 350 radio stations, articles in the media, a series of monthly videos, and training to help television weather presenters and reporters discuss climate change.

The organization conducts ongoing opinion polls of the American public on climate. Its climate change opinion polling has been described as being similar to the work of the Pew Research Center.

YPCCC has collaborated with the George Mason Center for Climate Change Communication to assemble a freely available dataset, which has been used to create interactive partisan climate opinion maps of the United States. These maps (also known as the Yale Climate Opinion maps) provide detailed information about "climate change beliefs, risk perception and policy support for climate-related policy at the state and local level."

The YPCCC website also offers tips on how activists and everyday people can communicate more effectively about climate change.

In July 2019, the organization suggested that discussing climate change more frequently with family and friends might be the most effective way of influencing US public opinion on climate.

Awards 
In 2017 the program was given a "Friend of the Planet" award by the National Center for Science Education in 2017.  In 2018, Leiserowitz and YPCCC researchers received the Warren J. Mitofsky Innovators Award, given by the American Association for Public Opinion Research. The award recognized "a new statistical method to downscale national public opinion estimates using multiple regression and post stratification (MPR) survey data collection methodology."

References

External links
 
 

Yale University
Climate change organizations based in the United States
Environmental organizations based in Connecticut
Environmental organizations established in 2005
2005 establishments in Connecticut
Climate communication